The 1946–47 Czechoslovak Extraliga season was the fourth season of the Czechoslovak Extraliga, the top level of ice hockey in Czechoslovakia. 11 teams participated in the league, and LTC Prag won the championship.

Regular season

Group A

Group B

Final 
 LTC Prag – I. ČLTK Prag 10:0
 I. ČLTK Praha – LTC Prag 8:5

External links
History of Czechoslovak ice hockey

Czechoslovak Extraliga seasons
Czech
Extra